{{DISPLAYTITLE:C23H32O2}}
The molecular formula C23H32O2 (molar mass: 340.49 g/mol, exact mass: 340.24023) may refer to:
 Dimethisterone, a pregnane
 Medrogestone

Molecular formulas